Pienaarsrivier is a town some  due north of Pretoria, north of the Pienaars River. The river is named after Petrus Gerhardus Jacobus Pienaar, born 26 February 1819 in George, Cape Colony, who trekked to the then Transvaal in 1858. He became a local pioneer farmer, and reputedly shot an elephant whilst hunting in the area. The Setswana name of this river is Moretele, from which the Moreletaspruit derives its name. The town Pienaarsrivier was established in 1908.

References

Populated places in the Bela-Bela Local Municipality
Populated places established in 1908